Operation Bura was a joint offensive conducted by the Croatian Defence Council and the Croatian Army on the territories held by the Nevesinje and Bileća brigades of the Army of Republika Srpska during the Bosnian War.

Background
As the Yugoslav People's Army (Jugoslovenska narodna armija – JNA) withdrew from Croatia following the acceptance and start of implementation of the Vance plan, its 55,000 officers and soldiers born in Bosnia and Herzegovina were transferred to a new Bosnian Serb army, which was later renamed the Army of Republika Srpska (Vojska Republike Srpske – VRS). This reorganisation followed the declaration of the Serbian Republic of Bosnia and Herzegovina on 9 January 1992, ahead of the 29 February – 1 March 1992 referendum on the independence of Bosnia and Herzegovina. This declaration would later be cited by the Bosnian Serbs as a pretext for the Bosnian War. Bosnian Serbs began fortifying the capital, Sarajevo, and other areas on 1 March. On the following day, the first fatalities of the war were recorded in Sarajevo and Doboj. In the final days of March, Bosnian Serb forces bombarded Bosanski Brod with artillery, drawing a border crossing by the HV 108th Brigade in response. On 4 April, JNA artillery began shelling Sarajevo.

The JNA and the VRS in Bosnia and Herzegovina faced the Army of the Republic of Bosnia and Herzegovina (Armija Republike Bosne i Hercegovine – ARBiH) and the Croatian Defence Council (Hrvatsko vijeće obrane – HVO), reporting to the Bosniak-dominated central government and the Bosnian Croat leadership respectively, as well as the HV, which occasionally supported HVO operations. A UN arms embargo introduced in September 1991, had hampered the preparation of the various forces, but in late April, the VRS was able to deploy 200,000 troops, along with hundreds of tanks, armoured personnel carriers (APCs) and artillery pieces, while the HVO and the Croatian Defence Forces (Hrvatske obrambene snage – HOS) could field approximately 25,000 soldiers and a handful of heavy weapons. The ARBiH was largely unprepared, however, lacking heavy weapons and possessing small arms for less than half of its force of approximately 100,000 troops. By mid-May 1992, when those JNA units which had not been transferred to the VRS withdrew from Bosnia and Herzegovina to the newly declared Federal Republic of Yugoslavia, the VRS controlled approximately 60 percent of Bosnia and Herzegovina.

Prelude
After the expulsion of the Serbian people from the Neretva valley, in the operation Čagalj, joint Croat-Bosniak forces planned a vigorous attack on multiple positions of the Nevesinjska brigade which would open up new a route to conquer all of Herzegovina.

The main objective of the attacker, with their stronghold in Mostar, was for the VRS to retreat from dominant positions in Prenj, Velež and Hrgud which were used to control all of Neretva.

Preparation of the offensive by the attacker, in regards to the expected outcome, was considered monumental

Offensive

Order of Battle
The attack units on the main way to attack were previously reorganized. In Zoran Janjić's book about the Nevesnjiska brigade VRS in the Mitrovdan offensive, the attacker formations are grouped in : 
 Battle group from the 2nd Brigade of the HVO with part of the units of the 1st Mostar Brigade was tasked with occupying the Sipovac facility and then, in cooperation with the units attacking from the direction of Fortica, to capture buildings Sveta Gora and Merdžan Glava.
 Two combat groups from the Z squad. HVO brigades were tasked with delving into the depths of the defense of the 2nd Battalion of the Nevesinje Brigade and attacking from the direction of the village of Veliki Banjdol, a howitzer battery in the area of Mali Banjdol village and battalion units in the villages of Smajkići and Patkovići;
 The 3rd HVO Brigade with one unit of 70 combatants from the 1st Mostar Brigade was tasked with attacking 4th Company Z. the battalion of the Nevesinje Brigade in Ravnice and to join in the Banjdola area with groups attacking from the background;
a sabotage group was tasked with delving into the depth of the combat deployment of the brigade and in the Bishina region wrecked the road to Nevesinje.

The grouping of infantry units from Busk to 690 was carried out by the 1st Mostar Brigade according to the following:

 The first battle group, concentrated in the wider Blagaj region, was tasked with attacking the part of the Busak-Kozjak front
 Čobanovo polje – Gnjilo Brdo;
 The second combat group was tasked with attacking from the area of the village of Gornji Vranjevici on the part of the Kobiljaca front – the village of Comori – the village of Kamena;
 The third combat group was tasked with attacking from the south the unit of the 4th Battalion of the Nevesinje Brigade in the village of Kamena;
 The fourth combat group was tasked with moving from the village of Svačići via Barevo dol and attacking units in the Dragolos – Marići village area;
 The fifth battle group was tasked with assisting the HVO units during occupation of level 690 and then onwards to occupy the villages of Gornji Brštanik and Scepan Krst.

HVO units had an area of responsibility from elevation 690 to the canyon of Radimlje, They were assigned to attack as follows:
 The sixth battle group was tasked with attacking in the direction of Kotašnica – Donji Brštanik – Šćepan Krst;
 The seventh battle group was tasked with attacking the village of Donja Ljubljanica – Scepan Krst.

The grouping of artillery units was carried out so that they could target all important targets in the area of responsibility of the brigade, but also the city of Nevesinje. Armored-mechanized units occupied the expected attack areas in the following directions: Hodovo village – Donji Brštanik village – Scepan Krst village and Bisce – Dračevice – Cobanovo field – Nevesinje.

Some units of Juke Prazina were hired to assist the forces in Mostar, and were placed under the joint command of the HVO and the so-called ARBiH.

The Defense was composed of units of the former 10th Herzegovina Motorized Brigade, later renamed the 8th Herzegovina Motorized Brigade, which was named Nevesinje Brigade of the Army of Republika Srpska. It consisted of just over 4,000 people, over 100 km in front, mainly Serbs from Nevesinje, Mostar and other places in the Neretva valley and a unit Bileć Volunteers under the command of the Duke Rade Radović. The brigade deployment was on the front line formed in the 5th Battalion and a mixed artillery regiment. Considering that part of the numerous condition was spent on units that were not in direct contact with the enemy, that about half of the people were resting at home, it is estimated that there were about 1,500 fighters in the units on the front line at the time of the attack. . In the days of battle the brigade had cooperation with 2. Herzegovina Light Infantry Brigade with Boraka as well as coordination with Bileć Brigade.

Timeline

To stretch the VRS forces on the left wing of the Nevesinje Brigade, major activities of artillery and infantry units began as early as 2 November, in the area of responsibility of the Bileca Brigade (Stolac and Berkovići municipalities). "In the first flight in the morning of November 2nd, dozens of multi-barrel rocket launchers or 320 destructive missiles were fired at positions of Serbian defenders in the Zegul and Bancic regions ... These attacks were carried out repeatedly, with the main routes of Poplat-Ravnica, Drenovac-Veliš and Hrasno-Bančići ".

The attack began early in the morning on 8 November and was distinguished by strong Artillery preparation as well as infantry assault. During the offensive, more than 20,000 shells were fired at the positions of the Serbian army. The barrage of 500–700 artillery barrels, which defense witnesses most often describe as terrifying and unbelievable, while referred to in the HV documents as a huge artillery support, it lasted uninterruptedly about 6 hours before the infantry departed, which it was hoped would "not have much to do" after the preparation.

The special "spearhead" strike of the entire offensive was directed at the villages Gornji Vranjevići and Kamena, where the 4th Motorized Battalion of the Nevesinje Brigade was stationed under the command of Captain Ranko Prodanovic. In the area of the village of Vranjevići the positions were held by Duke Rada Radović's volunteers, who were part of the 4th Battalion. The location of Vranjević was very significant, because its forcing directly threatened the position of the 1st Motorized Battalion at Brštanik and Scepan Krst (simultaneously attacked in the direction of Rotimlja village – Donji Brštanik village – Dabrica village and Hum-k. 690 – k.707 – Scepan Krst), as well as the 2nd (in the direction of the village of Vrapčići-Šipovac, the village of Banjdol) and the 3rd mtb in the area of Podveležje and Čobanovo Polje (attacked by the direction of Dračevica, Ravnica, Bakračuša). Such a thoughtful breakthrough and eventual development of the situation as desired by the attackers would provide a considerable favorable strategic and communication basis for further action towards Nevesinje.

In addition to this main strike, the attack also covered other areas at the Mostar-Nevesinje battlefield:
 Fighting in the Defense Area of the 2nd Battalion in Podvelez;
 Fighting in the defense area of the 1st Battalion and Air Defense Division in Donja Brštanik;
 Fighting in the 3rd Battalion Defense Area;
 The area of defense of the 5th Battalion is not covered by enemy infantry attacks, but is in all positions deployed by artillery.

Intensive artillery operations were manifested in the morning of the first day of battle, and were casual and selective during the day.

During the attack, active activities were carried out by the attackers and prepared sabotage groups. One of them also compromised the system of command-to-artillery battery at [Banjdol] (2nd Battalion) and then killed soldier Danilo Lozo, who left at 5 am on 8 November to set up connection. He was the first victim of this attack. This alarmed the artillerymen and the attack was repulsed.
The great losses at the outset were also averted by the absurd fact that the defense forces had a slightly lower occupancy of the lines due to the celebration of baptismal glory Mitrovdan a. On the front line, fighters who came directly from the celebration, but also old men, women, children, "all who could hold a rifle" or otherwise help, soon began to appear. The wounded were fleeing the hospital to defend their city and people.
On 8 November, Croat-Muslim forces in the Mostar-Nevesin direction continued their attacks on all parts of the front with strong artillery operations. The Corps Command was aware that intense fighting could be expected in the coming days.
Defense against enemy actions was characterized in the Brigade Command reports as persistent and, in some places, crucial, while the intensified effect of artillery in areas of concentration of enemy forces and firing positions of artillery in particular, and then in the next two days largely determined the end result of the action . In the documents of the Command of the VRS Corps, the last day of the frontal infantry attack was marked on 12 November, in the period from 10.45 to 11.20 h.
Први дан без борбених дејстава који се истовремено може сматрати крајем офанзиве је 15 November 1992. The only position that remained in the enemy's hands after the Battle of Mitrovdan was the Gradina Corner (tt 690), and it was returned without major problems to the HK VRS in the aftermath of the battle.

On 15 November, the Croat-Muslim formations, facing losses and breaking the line at major points of attack, crossed the defensive line. They were also confronted with the assumption that the failure of the action could cause the VRS offensive to the Neretva valley.

Casualties

The Republika Srpska Army presented information on its losses. In the direct combat operations, 38 soldiers and officers were killed. Fifteen days after the offensive at KBC Podgorica, he died, from
a consequence of the wounding, a member of the Herzegovina Corps sabotage squad. During the preparation of the offensive and in the immediate aftermath, two more soldiers and one civilian killed by the enemy shell, in Nevesinje, can also be counted as casualties. He concludes all these losses by figure 42. About 200 soldiers and officers and five civilians in Nevesinje were seriously injured and wounded.

Within the data of 42 Serbian soldiers and officers, it should be said that the structure by affiliation was as follows:
 from 8. Motorized Brigade - 34,
 from 2. light brigades from Borak]] - 4,
 from 7. Herzegovina Corps Mixed Artillery Regiment – 3
 from 7. Reconnaissance Detachment – 1.
Most were killed on the first day of the battle – 21

Attacker casualties – HV, HVO and ARBiH armies in this operation remain inaccessible to the public. But the "order of magnitude" can certainly be established on the basis of media reports, intelligence of the VRS and correlation of facts from the available documents. Radio Voice of America reported about 500 dead in those days. The Serbian Army lists 550 enemy soldiers killed. The Republika Srpska veterans' organization has information on about 800 liquidated. According to the documentation of the attackers, only the 3rd HVO brigade after the offensive lacks 200 soldiers for successful defense, and it is certain that a significant proportion of that number and the number of losses (killed, wounded, captured, deserted) during the unsuccessful offensive activities. Lieutenant Colonel Bozan Simovic was killed as commander of the "Special Purpose Unit Ludvig Pavlovic", who, in the tactical schedule of the operation, was the commander of the fifth combat group operating in the Brštanik – Scepan Krst area. In the same move, Pero Dalmatin, one of the founders of the HDZ in Capljina and a participant in the illegal arming and formation of paramilitary Croatian formations in Herzegovina, and a member of the command staff of the Croatian formations, was killed.

Consequences
The Republika Srpska Army achieved a significant victory by retaining positions from the beginning of the attack. This was a crucial defensive ordeal that, in addition to tactical strengths and stability, brought confidence to the defense in the south of Republika Srpska. This was also one of the last joint actions of the Croatian and Muslim forces in this region since the beginning 1993. started the Muslim-Croatian Conflict that lasted with minor interruptions until the end of the war. The Mostar-Nevesinje battlefield remained one of the more characteristic battlefields in the Defense-Fatherland War.  Constant tensions escalated with a new fierce attack Army of the Republic of Bosnia and Herzegovina, exactly two years later, known as the Second Mitrovdan Offensive.

Aftermath
The President of the Republika Srpska Radovan Karadzic sent to Nevesinje shortly after the battle, the envoy of the highest rank, Nikola Koljevic, to support and coordinate any further action in the defense of Herzegovina. VRS Main Staff, Commander General Ratko Mladic personally contacted the brigade commander and directed his support to the defense of Nevesinje and Herzegovina. The brigade was also praised by the Command of the Herzegovina Corps, headed by General Radovan Grubac.

On 28 June 1993, the Nevesinje Brigade was decorated by the President of Republika Srpska with the Order of Nemanjic

As a memento of the defense of the municipality and Herzegovina, Nevesinje municipality celebrates Mitrovdan as a baptismal glory and municipality day. Due to the successful organization of the defense and the importance of victory on 8 November, the Nevesinje Brigade of the VRS was later given the official name of the 8th Motorized Brigade.

The municipality of Nevesinje was awarded the Order of the Republika Srpska for its successful defense, to be exact, it was the first holder of this recognition.

The Mitrovdan Offensive has been sung in many songs and stories by various authors and performers.

See also 
 Bosnian War
 Herzegovina

References 

Bura